Grey House Publishing is an American publisher of directories and other reference books in business, health, education and other areas.

Its corporate headquarters are in Amenia, New York.  It also has a Canadian office in Toronto.

In 2013, Grey House Publishing became the licensed publisher of the print editions of the Salem Press product line, in an agreement with EBSCO Publishing. Grey House Publishing publishes print editions of the H.W. Wilson product line.

References

External links

Salem Press

Book publishing companies based in New York (state)